The Call of the Savage (1935) is a Universal serial based on the story Jan of the Jungle by Otis Adelbert Kline. It was directed by Lew Landers and released by Universal Pictures.

Plot
Two teams of scientists scour the dark jungles of Africa to find a secret formula.

Cast
 Noah Beery Jr. as Jan Trevor
 Dorothy Short as Mona Andreas
 Harry Woods as Borno
 Bryant Washburn as Dr. Harry Trevor
 Walter Meller as Dr. Frank Bracken
 Fred MacKaye as Dr. Charles Phillips
 John Davidson as Prince Samu
 J. Frank Glendon as Speaker at conference
 William Desmond as Allen
 Grace Cunard as Mrs. Camerford Amster
 Viva Tattersall as Georgia Trevor

Production
Call of the Savage features "Jan, the Jungle Boy" and was based on "Jan of the Jungle" by Otis Adelbert Kline, a successful pulp story which rivalled the Tarzan series.

In 1956 material from this serial was edited into a 70-minute film called Savage Fury.

Chapter titles
 Shipwrecked
 Captured by Cannibals
 Stampeding Death
 Terrors of the Jungle
 The Plunge of Peril
 Thundering Waters
 The Hidden Monster
 Jungle Treachery
 The Avenging Fire God
 Descending Doom
 The Dragon Strikes
 The Pit of Flame
Source:

See also
 List of American films of 1935
 List of film serials by year
 List of film serials by studio

References

External links

1935 films
1930s fantasy adventure films
American black-and-white films
Films based on short fiction
Universal Pictures film serials
Films directed by Lew Landers
American fantasy adventure films
1930s English-language films
Films with screenplays by George H. Plympton
Films set in Africa
Films set in jungles
1930s American films